A catchword is a word at the bottom of a page in a multi-paged document that anticipates the first word of the following page to assist their proper collation.

Catchword may also refer to:
Headword, in a dictionary
Catchword (game show)
Catchphrase
Catchword (company), a naming firm that creates names for companies and products.